Charmila (born 2 October 1974) is an Indian actress who predominantly works in Malayalam cinema. Apart from movies in Malayalam, she acted in Tamil, Telugu and Kannada movies. She completed almost 38 films in the Malayalam film industry.

Early life
Charmila was born to veterinary doctor Manoharan, who was also working in S.B.I., and Haise, a homemaker, in a Tamil Catholic family in Chennai. She studied in Holy Angels Convent and Ethiraj College for Women. She has a younger sister Angelina.

Personal life
She married Kishor Satya in 1996 and was later divorced in 1999.

Later, she married Rajesh in 2006, an engineer working in Nokia and got divorced in 2014. The couple have one son.

Film career
Charmila made her debut on the silver screen with Oyilattam and went on to act in a couple of movies including Kizhakke Varum Pattu. She was recommended in Tamil movies by veteran actor S.S.Rajendran . She made her debut in the Malayalam film Dhanam, directed by Sibi Malayil.

She hosted a show Jillunu Oru Sandhippu on Vijay TV, and participated in Jodi Number One on the same channel.

Partial filmography

TV shows
Red Carpet
Mun Jenmam
 JB Junction
 Comedy Festival
 Comedy Super Nite
 My Favourites
 Star Kitchen
 Innalathe Tharam
 Celebrity Kitchen
 Rani Maharani
 Manam Thirumbuthe
 Onnum Onnum Moonu
 ACV - Showcase
Entertainment News
Icebreak with Veena
Comedy Stars
Asianet News
Badayi Bunglavu
Editor's Hour
Nishkalangathayude Charmila
Open Talk
Star Chat
Jillunu Oru Sandhippu 
Jodi Number One

Television serials

Albums
 Fathima Beevi – Malayalam
 Uyir Naal Vare – Malayalam

Advertisements
 A J Jewellery – Malayalam

References

External links
 
 Charmila at MSI

Living people
1974 births
Indian film actresses
Actresses from Chennai
Actresses in Malayalam cinema
20th-century Indian actresses
21st-century Indian actresses
Ethiraj College for Women alumni
Actresses in Telugu cinema
Actresses in Tamil cinema
Actresses in Kannada cinema
Indian television actresses
Actresses in Malayalam television
Actresses in Tamil television